Coleophora genuina is a moth of the family Coleophoridae.

References

genuina
Moths described in 1988